Krigia cespitosa, known as common dwarf-dandelion,  opposite-leaved dwarf-dandelion, or weedy dwarfdandelion, is a North American species of plant in the family Asteraceae . It is native to northeastern Mexico (Nuevo León) and to the southeastern and south-central United States, from Florida to Texas and north as far as southeastern Nebraska, southern Illinois, and central West Virginia

Krigia cespitosa is an annual herb up to 42 cm (16.8 inches) tall. One plant generally produces one flower head per flower stalk, each head with 12–35 yellow ray flowers but no disc flowers.

References

Cichorieae
Plants described in 1817
Flora of North America